John Carl Flügel (13 June 1884 – 6 August 1955), was a British experimental psychologist and a practising psychoanalyst.

Training and career
Flügel was born in Liverpool on 13 June 1884, to a German father and English mother.

Psychoanalytic career and writings

Flügel's book Psychoanalytic Study of the Family (1921) was acclaimed by Eric Berne for its insights into the Oedipus complex.  He also published Men and their Motives (1934) and The Psychology of Clothes (1930), the latter continuing to influence thinking on the subject into the 21st century.

In Man, Morals and Society (1945), Flugel charted a movement from egocentrism to social awareness by way of what he saw as a hierarchy of expanding loyalties.  Reaching back to his old mentor, he also highlighted “the distinction that McDougall has sometimes made between an 'ideal', which is little more than an intellectual assent to a moral proposition, and a 'sentiment', which involves a real mobilisation”.

Marriage and death

In 1913 Flügel married Ingeborg Klingberg, who also became a psychoanalyst. They had one daughter. Flügel died in London on 17 August 1955.

See also

References

Further reading

 Graham Richards, Flügel, John Carl (1884–1955), Oxford Dictionary of National Biography.
 FLUGEL, John Carl, Who Was Who, A & C Black, 1920–2008; online edn, Oxford University Press, Dec 2007, accessed 30 Jan 2012

1884 births
1955 deaths
British psychologists
British psychoanalysts
British Esperantists
Parapsychologists
Presidents of the British Psychological Society
Analysands of Ernest Jones
Translators of Sigmund Freud
British people of German descent
Alumni of Balliol College, Oxford
Alumni of the University of London
Academics of the University of London
20th-century British psychologists